Deserticossus curdus is a moth in the family Cossidae. It is found in Iraq.

The length of the forewings is about 20 mm. The forewings are brown, but dark brown at the veins and light brown between the veins. The hindwings are dark-grey, but lighter in the anal area at the base.

References

Natural History Museum Lepidoptera generic names catalog

Cossinae
Moths described in 2006
Moths of Asia